Kennet Partners is a private equity investment firm that provides growth capital to software, Internet and technology-enabled business services companies in Europe and the US.

Kennet Partners is headquartered in London, England, and has an office in San Francisco, California. The firm raised its fourth fund in 2014, bringing total capital under management to $700 million.

Founding / history 
Kennet was founded in 1997 as Kennet Capital, a joint venture between technology investment bank Broadview International and asset management firm Electra Partners.  In 2000, Kennet became a wholly owned subsidiary of Broadview.  In 2003 the partners of Kennet completed a management buy-out and became independent.
 
Kennet's first fund was primarily targeted at early-stage technology investments in Europe.  With its second fund, Kennet began making growth equity investments in both Europe and the U.S., and this has remained the firm’s exclusive strategy to this day.

Funds and investments 
Kennet has raised five funds: 
 1997 Kennet I LP (£48.3 million)
 2000 Kennet II LP ($204 million)
 2008 Kennet III LP (€201 million)
 2014 Kennet IV LP (€105 million)
 2020 Kennet V LP ($250 million)

Institutional investors in the Kennet funds include Access Capital Partners, Adveq, Alpha Associates, BNP Private Equity, Credit Suisse, European Investment Fund, LGT Capital Partners and Siemens.

Investments
Since inception, Kennet has invested in 60 companies, of which Kennet's most notable exits include Altitun, Paragon Software, No Wires Needed, Cramer Systems, Chipidea, Adviva Media, NetPro, MedeAnalytics, GoViral, FRS Global, Prolexic Technologies, and Schoolwires. 

Other investments include:

 ABA English
 Adikteev
 Aspective
 BuyVIP
 Consul Risk Management
 Clearswift
 Conversica
 Daptiv (fka eProject)
 Impartner
 Intelepeer (fka VoEX)
 Kapow Technologies
 Kemp
 Monis Software
 Orchestream
 RealityMine
 Receipt Bank
 Recommind
 Rivo Software
 Rimilia
 Sequans Communications
 Sermo
 Spreadshirt
 STS BV
 Telemedicine Clinic
 ThinkHR
 TradingPartners
 Ubizen
 Volantis Systems

Competitors 
Kennet's investment strategy is similar to that of other growth capital investment firms such as Summit Partners, TA Associates and Insight Venture Partners.  In Europe, Kennet competes with firms such as Eight Roads Ventures, Highland Europe, Scottish Equity Partners and the growth equity arm of Index Ventures.  Competitors in the U.S. include JMI Equity and Summit Partners' Accelerator Fund.

References

Further reading

 How Much Bootstrapping Is Enough Javier Rojas, SoftGram 2008.
 A Q&A with Jon Craton, Founder, Cramer Systems Sandhill.com, 14 August 2008. 
 How to convert to SaaS Sandill.com, June 2008.
 Bootstrapping, over crowding and capital efficiency: a contrarian view Prakash Muralidharan, Thoughts from the trench, 17 March 2007.
 Have you considered bootstrapping your business for success? Javier Rojas, Opportunity World, July/August 2006.
 Strategic Entrepreneurship: Why it is better to be bootstrapped than well-heeled Jonathan Guthrie, 7 December 2005.
 El Ciclo del Capital riesgo en Europa: Su gestion y aportaction de valor FUNDACIÓN DE ESTUDIOS FINANCIEROS, March 2005.

External links 
Kennet Partners(company website) 
Tornado Insider Profile
The Funded.com Kennet Partners profile
PSEPS Directory
Datamonitor Profile

Private equity firms of the United Kingdom
Financial services companies based in London